The Federal Agricultural Research Center (FAL), headquartered in Braunschweig, was a federal authority of the Federal Ministry of Food, Agriculture and Consumer Protection.  On January 1, 2008, FAL was split into the Johann Heinrich von Thünen Institute, the Julius Kuehn Institute and the Friedrich Loeffler Institute.

The Federal Research Institute for Agriculture was divided into four areas:
 Soil / Plant (Plant Nutrition and Soil Science, Agronomy and green agriculture, agro-ecology)
 Animal (animal nutrition, animal husbandry, animal welfare and animal husbandry)
 Technology (technology and biosystems, engineering and Construction)
 Agricultural Economics (Business Administration, Rural areas, market and agricultural trade policy)

There was also a Institute of Organic Farming in Westerau.

Institutes
 Institute for Plant Nutrition and Soil Science in Braunschweig
 Institute for Crop and Green Agriculture in Braunschweig
 Institute for Agricultural Ecology in Braunschweig
 Institute for organic farming in Westerau
 Institute for Animal Welfare and Animal Husbandry in Celle
 Institute for Animal Nutrition in Braunschweig
 Institute for Animal Breeding in Mariensee (Neustadt am Rübenberge)
 Institute for Technology and Biosystems in Braunschweig
 Institute of Industrial Technology and Construction in Braunschweig
 Institute of Management in Braunschweig
 Institute for Rural Studies in Braunschweig
 Institute for Market Analysis and Agricultural Trade Policy in Braunschweig

External links 
  Johann Heinrich von Thünen-Institut Bundesforschungsinstitut für Ländliche Räume, Wald und Fischerei

Agriculture in Germany
Organisations based in Braunschweig
Government agencies established in 1977